Bigbyville is an unincorporated community in Maury County, in the U.S. state of Tennessee.

History
The first settlement at Bigbyville was made about 1807. A post office called Bigbyville was established in 1829, and remained in operation until 1903.

Notable person
Felix Zollicoffer, a United States Congressman from Tennessee, was born in Bigbyville in 1812.

References

Unincorporated communities in Maury County, Tennessee
Unincorporated communities in Tennessee